Samoskevich is a surname. Notable people with the surname include:
 Mackie Samoskevich (born 2002), American ice hockey player
 Melissa Samoskevich (born 1997), American ice hockey player and coach